Masset is a village in Haida Gwaii in British Columbia, Canada.

Masset may also refer to:

 Masset Airport, airport located northeast of Masset, British Columbia, Canada
 Masset Formation, volcanic formation on Graham Island of Haida Gwaii in British Columbia, Canada 
 Masset Inlet, saltwater bay located in the heart of the lowland of northern Graham Island
 Masset Sound, saltwater inlet on Graham Island
 Masset Water Aerodrome, aerodrome located adjacent to Masset, British Columbia, Canada
 CFS Masset, a Canadian Forces station and signals intercept facility located near Masset, British Columbia